Glauco Della Porta (7 August 1920 – 6 May 1976) was an Italian politician and economist. He was born in Naples, Kingdom of Italy. He was mayor of Rome (1962–1964). He died in Rome, Italy.

References

1920 births
1976 deaths
20th-century Italian politicians
Italian economists
Mayors of Rome
Knights Grand Cross of the Order of Merit of the Italian Republic
Grand Officers of the Order of Merit of the Italian Republic